The Campeonato Paulista Série A1, commonly known as Campeonato Paulista, nicknamed Paulistão, is the top-flight professional football league in the Brazilian state of São Paulo. Run by the FPF, the league is contested between 16 clubs and typically lasts from January to April. Rivalries amongst four of the best-known Brazilian teams (Corinthians, Palmeiras, Santos and São Paulo) have marked the history of the competition. The Campeonato Paulista is the oldest established league in Brazil, being held since 1902 and professionally since 1933.

Format
Campeonato Paulista is held annually by the Federação Paulista de Futebol (São Paulo State Football Federation), or FPF, amongst teams residing within the state of São Paulo. 20 clubs compete in the highest level of the championship (Série A1). In a new format starting in 2007, each team plays the others once in a round-robin format, followed by a four-team playoff with home-and-away series. In addition, teams that finish the regular season in places 5 through 8 (that do not reside within the city of São Paulo or Santos) will compete in a playoff for the title of "Campeão do Interior" (Upstate Champion). The four lowest placed teams are relegated to the lower competition (Série A2) for the following year.

Série A2 is contested by 20 teams in three separate phases. In Phase One, the teams are split into two groups, playing each other twice in a home-and-home series. The bottom two from each group are relegated to Série A3; the top four advance to Phase Two. Phase two consists of the eight advancing teams organized into groups, repeating the home-and-home series within the group. The top two placed teams from each group are promoted to Série A1; each top team advances to Phase Three, a single championship game to determine the tournament winner.

Série A3 consists of 20 teams competing in a three phase format similar to Série A2. Promotion and relegation rules are the same as in this higher level.

The Second Division (Série B) matches are held by minor teams during the Brazilian league. The number of teams involved varies, with 45 participants in 2011. Top four teams are promoted to Série A3.

History

Founding
Charles Miller was responsible for the creation of the first São Paulo state tournament. Miller introduced the football association rules to Brazil upon his return from England, where he attended college and discovered the sport. On December 14, 1901, the Liga Paulista de Foot-Ball (Paulista Football League), or LPF was founded, comprising five initial teams: São Paulo Athletic Club, Internacional, Mackenzie, Germânia, and Paulistano. Between April and October 1902, those teams competed in the first edition of the tournament, with São Paulo AC winning the title and Miller himself as the leading goalscorer. Unlike in Argentina and Uruguay, football was restricted to elitist clubs in its early days in Brazil.

Football popularity grew in following years. Paulistano, a club composed of the children of the richest families of São Paulo, became the strongest team. However, the popularity base of the sport started to change after a brilliant exhibition tour by the Corinthians, a London amateur team, in São Paulo and Rio de Janeiro. They easily defeated the best Brazilian teams of the time and made a very favorable impression amongst the younger fans. Shortly thereafter, a group of workers were inspired to found the city's first popular team, Sport Club Corinthians Paulista.

1910s–1930s
Growth of football popularity amongst lower classes generated a rift in the LPF. Their directors had defended that football should remain an elitist sport. This difference in opinion led to creation of another competing league, the Associação Paulista de Esportes Atléticos (Paulista Association of Athletic Sports), APEA, which promoted the sport among all social classes. Corinthians and Palestra Itália (a new club founded by Italian immigrants), and Paulistano helped to comprise the new league.

The LPF ceased operation in 1917. Until 1926, the APEA remained the only league in São Paulo. Stronger teams, larger crowds and players such Neco (Corinthians) and Arthur Friedenreich (Paulistano) contributed to the footballmania that converted football from "foreigner's fun" to Brazil's most popular sport. Debates surrounded the issue of whether football should professionalize or remain a purely amateur endeavor. Paulistano, the most trophied team at the time, refused to become professional and departed in 1925 to create the Liga de Amadores de Futebol (League of Football Amateurs) [LAF]. Competition between the two leagues fueled expansion of the teams, as clubs from upstate began to join.

By 1930, the LAF and Paulistano had folded, and a new era for São Paulo football began. Players became professionals in 1933 when Bandeirante Football League was created. Corinthians and Palestra Itália assumed their positions as the most powerful and popular teams. A new club emerges to compete for the hearts of supporters. Some dissidents from Paulistano, favorable to professionalization, along with the directors of AA Palmeiras united to form São Paulo Futebol Clube, the third force of the city.

Modern era
The APEA had ceased operations in 1938, and after several name changes, the original Bandeirante Football League officially became the Federação Paulista de Futebol (Paulista Football Federation), [FPF] on April 22, 1941. São Paulo signed Leonidas da Silva in the following year and won five of the next eight championships. Palestra Itália change its name to Palmeiras in 1943 due to a World War II period law that banned Axis Powers's references in sport. Football grows within the state and a second division is created in 1948, allowing upstate teams to take part in major league competition. XV de Novembro from Piracicaba was the first team promoted to the top flight.

São Paulo, Palmeiras and Corinthians dominated titles in early 1950s. Santos, although having competed consistently, would need to wait a few more years to gain top status. 1957 saw the debut of one of football's greatest players, Pelé. His goals helped Santos to win nine of the next twelve championships. Pelé was the league top scorer in every year between 1957 and 1965 including a record 58 goals in a single season. Santos won numerous competitions at the state, national, regional and international level. Palmeiras's "Academia" teams were the only ones able to break such dominance in the sixties.

Since the 1960s, Brazil began to develop more mature national competitions which competed with the state and regional tournaments for supporter's attention. In 1977, Corinthians' were able to win a title after a 24-year drought, and the early eighties saw the battle between Corinthians (led by Sócrates) and São Paulo's (Serginho Chulapa). The "Corinthians Democracy" won in 1982 and 1983 while introducing a new philosophy in club management, where players participate in all decisions with management. São Paulo became the most successful team of the decade, winning the championship in 1980, 1981, 1985, 1987 and 1989. The last years saw the emergence of players such as Müller and Silas (known as the "Menudos do Morumbi") on that team. Internacional from Limeira accomplished a great upset in 1986 by defeating Palmeiras to win the final.

Bragantino vs. Novorizontino was the final in the 1990 championship in the Paulistão's biggest ever upset. Palmeiras' fans saw their club win the 1993, 1994 and 1996 championships with the greatest Brazilian squad of the decade. Rivaldo, Roberto Carlos, Edmundo, César Sampaio are among the members of the "Green Machine" which scored 100 goals in the 1996 tournament. Corinthians conquered the trophy five times in the 1995–2003 period, thus becoming the most successful team in the first 100 years of the Campeonato Paulista, with 25 titles.

Since 2000, Campeonato Paulista has lost popularity with each year. The main São Paulo state teams treat the tournament as tune-ups for the more lucrative Copa Libertadores and Brazilian National Championship. However, the Paulistão, as well as the other state tournaments in Brazil, still hold significance by providing developing talent and sustaining grass-roots soccer within the state.

Due to the COVID-19 death toll has reached an unprecedented levels across the country, the government decided to subspened the championship from 15 March 2021 till 30 March 2021 aiming to stop the spread of the coronavirus.

On September 23, 2021, the São Paulo Football Federation recognizes the São Paulo titles of 1933 and 1934, to Albion and Juventus respectively.

Teams

The following teams will compete in the Campeonato Paulista in the 2023 season.

Past tournaments

Winners and goalscorers

 LPF — Liga Paulista de Foot-Ball (Paulista Football League)
 APEA — Associação Paulista de Esportes Atléticos (Paulista Association of Athletic Sports)
 LAF — Liga Amadores de Futebol (Amateur Football League)
 FPF (1933–2934) — Federação Paulista de Football (Paulista Football Federation), affiliate to the Federação Brasileira de Football (Brazilian Football Federation)
 LFP — Liga de Futebol Paulista (Paulista Football League)
 LFESP — Liga de Futebol do Estado de São Paulo (São Paulo State Football League)
 All editions starting in 1941 organized by the FPF — Federação Paulista de Futebol (Paulista Football Federation)

Supercampeonato Paulista

In 2002, the FPF organized the Super Championship with the top 3 teams in the 2002 Rio-São Paulo Tournament (Corinthians, São Paulo and Palmeiras) and the 2002 Paulista Champions (Ituano). São Paulo won the Championship.

Semi-finals

Held on May 19 and 22

|}

Final matches

TopscorerBasílio (Ituano) – 4 goals

Titles by club

Titles by city

Most appearances

Below is the list of clubs that have more than 40 appearances in the competition.

Notes
Includes 2002 Supercampeonato Paulista.
Portuguesa includes Mackenzie/Portuguesa participations (1920, 1921, 1922).
In 1927, Corinthians has disputed both LAF and APEA championships.

Names change

Due to the World War II (and the fact of Brazil integrating the allied forces), during the year of 1942 Palestra Itália changed the name to the currently SE Palmeiras.
For the same motive as Palestra Itália, SC Germânia also was changed to the currently EC Pinheiros, but never has competed in a Campeonato Paulista edition with that name.
After changed their affiliation from APEA to FPF in 1994, CA Juventus changed its name to CA Fiorentino. Previously the club was also named CA Cotonificio Rodolfo Crespi, name of the textile company that gave rise to the club. Upon returning to APEA, it was used the name CA Juventus again.
Hespanha/Espanha is the currently Jabaquara AC.
São Paulo Railway (SPR) is the currently Nacional AC.
After partnering with the energy drinks company Red Bull in 2020, CA Bragantino as changed the name to "Red Bull Bragantino" (or RB Bragantino) how did it happen with RB Leipzig and RB Salzburg.

Campeonato Paulista do Interior

Format
The competition, held since 2007, is played in two-legged semifinals and final by the four best placed countryside São Paulo state clubs that did not reach the semifinal stage of the Campeonato Paulista in the season. Which in turn, is the 5th to 8th place of the first stage of Campeonato Paulista, except the teams from the city of São Paulo and also including Santos.

Past tournaments

Winners

Titles by club

See also
 Campeonato Paulista Série A2
 Campeonato Paulista Série A3
 Campeonato Paulista Segunda Divisão
 Federação Paulista de Futebol

References

External links

 Home of the FPF 
 Paulistão Play - Official online platform for transmission
 Paulistão at Facebook
 Paulistão at YouTube
 Paulistão at Twitter
 Paulistão at Instagram
 Gazeta Esportiva History of the Campeonato Paulista 

 
Paulista
Football leagues in São Paulo (state)